Davy Crockett – In Hearts United is a 1909 American silent Western film starring Charles K. French as Davy Crockett, with Evelyn Graham, Charles Bauman, Charles W. Travis and Charles Inslee. The film was directed by Fred Balshofer, produced by Bison Film Company, and distributed by New York Motion Picture Co. It was commercially released on June 4, 1909 in the United States. It is believed to be the first movie ever made about Davy Crockett.

Plot
The fictional romance depicts frontiersman Crockett rescuing a woman named Anna in mid-ceremony from marriage to a man she doesn't love. She and Crockett ride off on his horse. They go directly to a minister who marries them, and he brings her home to his mother.

References

External links
 
 

1909 films
1909 Western (genre) films
American black-and-white films
American silent short films
Cultural depictions of Davy Crockett
Silent American Western (genre) films
Films directed by Fred J. Balshofer
1900s American films
1900s English-language films